The  Sri Lankan High Commissioner to Australia is the Sri Lankan envoy to Australia. Countries belonging to the Commonwealth of Nations typically exchange High Commissioners, rather than Ambassadors. Though there are a few technical differences (for instance, whereas Ambassadors present their diplomatic credentials to the host country's head of state, High Commissioners are accredited to the head of government), they are in practice one and the same office. The Sri Lankan High Commissioner to Australia is concurrently accredited as High Commissioner to New Zealand, Papua New Guinea, and Fiji.

High Commissioners
The current High Commissioner is J. C. Weliamuna. Former High Commissioners include:

James Aubrey Martensz
P. R. Gunasekera
Major General Anton Muttukumaru
B. F. Perera
General Deshamanya Denis Perera
Neville Jansz
Edwin Hurulle
Elmo de J. Seneviratne
H. K. J. R. Bandara
K. Balapatabendi
Wickrema Weerasooria
General Cyril Ranatunga
Major General Janaka Perera
Admiral Thisara Samarasinghe
Felix Dias Abeyesinghe
Nissanka Wijesundera 
Senaka Walgampaya
Somasunadaran Skandakumar

See also

List of heads of missions from Sri Lanka

References

The Embassy of Sri Lanka

Australia and the Commonwealth of Nations

Sri Lanka and the Commonwealth of Nations
Sri Lanka
Australia